Simon Haskel, Baron Haskel (born 9 October 1934) is a British Labour Party politician and life peer.

Life and career
Simon Haskel was educated at Sedbergh School and Salford College of Advanced Technology (now the University of Salford), where he graduated with a BSc in Textile Technology. He then built up his own national and international textile firm, the Perrotts Group Plc.

Haskel was created a life peer in the House of Lords on 4 October 1993, taking the title Baron Haskel, of Higher Broughton in the County of Greater Manchester. He served as a Lord-in-Waiting in the first Blair ministry from May 1997 to August 1998.

References

External links 
 Lord Haskel House of Lords

1934 births
Living people
Labour Party (UK) life peers
Jewish British politicians
Labour Friends of Israel
Life peers created by Elizabeth II